Paksong is a city in Laos on the Bolaven Plateau. The city is known for its coffee exports. It is the capital of Paksong District.

References 

Populated places in Champasak Province